Khiladi 786 is a 2012 Indian Hindi-language action comedy film directed by Ashish R Mohan. The film stars Akshay Kumar, Asin, Himesh Reshammiya, Mithun Chakraborty, Raj Babbar and Mukesh Rishi. It is the eighth installment in the Khiladi film series.

Plot
Champaklal Desai is a successful match-maker and wedding organizer in Mumbai whose business starts going downhill when his son Mansukh joins him. After destroying many weddings unintentionally, Mansukh is thrown out of the house by Champak. A depressed Mansukh pays a visit to his friend Jeevanlal Praanlal D'Costa, who advises him to stop drinking, but Mansukh doesn't listen. Jeevanlal snatches the bottle, but in the process, the bottle crashes into the windshield of a car, due to which the car crashes into a tree and stops.

The car was being driven by Indu, who intentionally scares her grooms away by taking them for a dangerous long drive, the same trick she was using when her car crashed into the tree. Indu turns out to be the sister of an underworld don TTT, i.e. Tatya Tukaram Tendulkar, who wants to get her married to a decent family. TT's goons abduct Mansukh and Jeevanlal due to the incident. On learning that Mansukh is a match-maker, TT assigns him the task of finding a good groom for Indu, in return for letting Mansukh live. Jeevanlal is sure that they're going to die, but Mansukh claims that he knows a perfect groom for her.

This groom is none other than Bahattar Singh, a.k.a. Khiladi 786, a police officer from a small village Taasi in Punjab., who never lets goons get away. His family consists of his father Sattar Singh, Sattar's younger brother Ikhattar Singh, and their wives [Sattar, Ikhattar, Bhattar, and Chauhattar mean 70, 71, 72 and 74]. It is mentioned that Bahattar's brother Tehattar (73) was lost as a child. Even Bahattar has had tough luck in finding a bride. But there's one thing Mansukh doesn't know; Bahattar and his family just pretend to be cops and wear fake uniforms. When Mansukh comes to their doorstep with an alliance for Bahattar, he lies to them by saying that TT is the assistant commissioner of police, due to which Bahattar and his family are forced to carry on their police act.

On reaching Mumbai, two families in the same house pretend that they are from the Police. Bahattar is constantly trying to woo Indu, but she's having none of it, since she already has a boyfriend named Azad Reddy. Azad is in jail, and whenever he is released, he performs some stupid act due to which he is put back in jail. On learning about Azad, Bahattar helps Indu break him out of jail. Due to this act, Indu realises that Bahattar is a nice person and develops an affection for him. After reuniting Azad and Indu, Indu and Bahattar are saying goodbye to one another, when they learn that the other's family are not cops. Azad interferes and talks rudely to Indu and tries to slap her, but is stopped, slapped and pushed away by Bahattar. Indu now realises that Bahattar is a better person to marry, and holds his hand and walks home.

Now Indu and Bahattar tell Mansukh, who has by now already learnt the truth about the families, to continue the act and not let each family know the truth about the other. But sadly on the wedding day, they learn the truth. Immediately, Azad and his goons abduct Indu. Bahattar and TT fight them and rescue Indu. TT realises that Bahttar is the perfect man for her and blesses their alliance. To top the happiness, Tehattar Singh arrives, who is now a real police officer in Mumbai, and thus the family is reunited.

Cast

 Akshay Kumar in a dual role as Bahattar Singh (72) and  Tehattar Singh (73), Bahattar's brother
 Asin as Indu Tendulkar
 Himesh Reshammiya as Mansukh Desai
 Mithun Chakraborty as Tatya Tukaram Tendulkar (TTT), Indu's brother
 Raj Babbar as Sattar Singh (70), Bahattar's father
 Mukesh Rishi as Ikhatar Singh (71), Sattar's younger brother and Bahattar's uncle
 Manoj Joshi as Champaklal Desai, Mansukh's father
 Gurpreet Ghuggi as Sukhi
 Rahul Singh as Azad Reddy
 Sanjay Mishra as Jeevanlal Praanlal D'costa
 Johnny Lever as Inspector Bhalerao Kambli
 Rajesh Khattar as Inspector Jugnu Singh
 Mukesh Tiwari as Jailor
 Sejal Shah as Jigna, Champaklal's wife
 Bharti Singh as Milli
 Navin Prabhakar as Raj, Indu's husband-to-be whom she scares away
 Mushtaq Khan as Bhagat, Milli's brother
 Cyndy Khojol as Cheen
 Claudia Ciesla as a special appearance in the song "Balma"

Production
In March 2012, it was announced that Ashish R Mohan and Himesh Reshammiya would be creating an action-comedy film starring Akshay Kumar. In April the title was identified as Khiladi 786, the return to the Khiladi series after 12 years.

Casting
Reshammiya reported casting issues therefore the film was delayed. In April 2012 Amitabh Bachchan and Salman Khan  was signed to play a main role. He soon dropped out and was replaced by Mithun Chakraborty. Claudia Ciesla was roped into a special appearance to do an item number.

Many rumours went out about the female leads. The choices included Ileana D'Cruz, Nargis Fakhri and Diana Penty. However, in June 2012, Asin was signed.

Filming
The filming began on 2 June 2012, for a 20-day schedule in Kamalistan Studios. The action sequences were provided by Jal Singh Nijjar and Peshal Oli

Soundtrack
The soundtrack was composed by Himesh Reshammiya and the music was sold to T-Series. Lyrics were penned by Sameer, R Mehndi, Shabbir Ahmed and Reshammiya. Punjabi rapper Yo Yo Honey Singh recorded the song "O Bawariya" for the film. Reshammiya sang the song "Hookah Bar".

Reception

Critical response
Taran Adarsh on Bollywood Hungama gave the movie 3.5/5 stars and said that it was "for lovers of hardcore masala films completely." Madhureeta Mukherjee from Times of India stated, "For those looking for some logic-less laugh time, groovy tunes topped with some todh-podh – this one could bring some action to your weekend."

Box office

India
Khiladi 786 opened to strong response at single screens but weak at multiplexes. It netted  on its second day of release.

Khiladi 786 collected  in week two.

Overseas
Khiladi 786 had a poor reception overseas with around $0.5 million over the first weekend. It collected $1.5 million in ten days overseas.

Award nominations
Himesh Reshammiya was Nominated for Breakthrough Supporting Performance (Male) – Stardust Awards 2013.

References

External links
 
 
 

2012 films
Indian action comedy films
2010s Hindi-language films
2012 action comedy films
Twins in Indian films
Hari Om Entertainment films
HR Musik films
Films scored by Himesh Reshammiya
Film censorship in Pakistan
Film controversies in Pakistan
Censored films
2012 comedy films